Sanderson is an extinct town in Douglas County, in the U.S. state of Washington.

A post office called Sanderson was established in 1908, and remained in operation until 1920. Thomas Sanderson, an early postmaster, gave the community his name.

References

Ghost towns in Washington (state)
Geography of Douglas County, Washington